A Master of Laws (M.L. or LL.M.; Latin:  or ) is an advanced postgraduate academic degree, pursued by those either holding an undergraduate academic law degree, a professional law degree, or an undergraduate degree in a related subject. In most jurisdictions, the "Master of Laws" is the advanced professional degree for those usually already admitted into legal practice.

Background on legal education in common law countries
To become a lawyer and practice law in most states and countries, a person must first obtain a law degree. While in most common law countries a Bachelor of Laws (LL.B.) is required, the U.S. generally require a professional doctorate, or Juris Doctor, to practice law.

The Juris Doctor (J.D.) is a professional doctorate and professional graduate degree in law. The degree is earned by completing law school in the United States, Canada, Australia, and other common law countries.  Many who hold the degree of Juris Doctor are professionals committed to the practice of law, and may choose to focus their practice on criminal law, tort, family law, corporate law, or a wide range of other areas. The majority of individuals holding a J.D. must pass an examination in order to be licensed to practice law within their respective jurisdictions.

If a person wishes to gain specialized knowledge through research in a particular area of law, they can continue their studies after an LL.B. or J.D. in an LL.M. program. The word legum is the genitive plural form of the Latin word lex and means "of the laws". When used in the plural, it signifies a specific body of laws, as opposed to the general collective concept embodied in the word jus, from which the words "juris" and "justice" derive.  LL.M. is sometimes incorrectly written L.L.M., but Latin abbreviations of plural terms are indicated by doubling the abbreviation of the singular term.

The highest degree in law is the Doctor of Juridical Science (S.J.D or J.S.D., depending on the institution), and it is equivalent to the Doctor of Philosophy in Law (Ph.D. or DPhil) or doctorat en droit (in France). The full equivalent in Germany is the  Doktor der Rechtswissenschaften (Dr. iur.) (but German universities require completion of a second doctoral thesis, a Habilitation, to become qualified for teaching as a full professor, but can waive this requirement and usually do so for qualified foreigners). There are also variant doctoral degrees, such as the D.C.L. (Doctor of Civil Law) degree bestowed by McGill University in Canada.  Most schools require an LL.M. before admission to an S.J.D. or a Ph.D. in law degree program.  Like the Ph.D., the S.J.D. degree generally requires a dissertation that is graded (often by two graders), orally defended (by an exam known as viva voce) and then often published as a book or series of articles. The "Doctor of Laws" (LL.D.) degree in the United States is usually an honorary degree.

International situation

Historically, the LL.M. degree is an element particular to the education system of English speaking countries, which is based on a distinction between Bachelor's and Master's degrees. Over the past years, however, specialized LL.M. programs have been introduced in many European countries, even where the Bologna process has not yet been fully implemented.

Bosnia and Herzegovina, Denmark, Sweden, Norway, Italy and Switzerland require a Master's with an additional two to five years to become a lawyer.

As of 2014, Spain requires a master's degree in addition to a 4 years' degree to become a lawyer.

In Finland, an LL.M. is the standard graduate degree required to practice law. No other qualifications are required.

To be allowed to practice law in the Netherlands, one needs an LL.M. degree with a specific (set of) course(s) in litigation law. The Dutch Order of Lawyers (NOVA) require these courses for every potential candidate lawyer who wants to be conditionally written in the district court for three years. After receiving all the diplomas prescribed by NOVA and under supervision of a "patroon" (master), a lawyer is eligible to have his own practice and is unconditionally written in a court for life but he/she will need to continually update his/her knowledge.

Types of LL.M. degrees

There is a wide range of LL.M. programs available worldwide, allowing students to focus on almost any area of the law. Most universities offer only a small number of LL.M. programs. One of the most popular LL.M. degrees in the United States is tax law, sometimes referred to as an MLT (Master of Laws in Taxation).

Other LL.M. degree programs include bankruptcy law, banking law, commercial law, criminal law, data privacy law, dispute resolution, construction law, cybersecurity law, entertainment law, environmental law, estate planning (usually as a sub-specialty of tax law), financial services law, human rights law, information technology law, insurance law, intellectual property law, international law, law and economics, litigation, maritime law, military law, patent law, prosecutorial sciences, real estate law, social care law, telecommunications law, trade law, Trial Advocacy. Some law schools allow LL.M. students to freely design their own program of study from the school's many upper-level courses and seminars, including commercial and corporate, international, constitutional, and human rights law.

In Europe, LL.M. programs in European law are recently very popular, often referred to as LL.M. Eur (Master of European Law).

In the Netherlands and its former colonies, the title used was Meester in de Rechten (mr.). This title is still widely used in the Netherlands and Flanders (Belgium), especially by those who studied Dutch or Belgium law respectively.

Some LL.M. programs, particularly in the United States, and also in China, focus on teaching foreign lawyers the basic legal principles of the host country (a "comparative law" degree).

Moreover, some programs are conducted in more than one language, give the students the opportunity to undertake classes in differing languages.

The length of time it will take you to study an LLM program will depend on your mode of study. Most full-time on-campus courses take one academic year to complete, and this is a busy intensive year of study so students need to factor in the cost of not working while they study. Other students may complete their LLM program on a part-time basis over two years but increasingly courses are available online. These courses are aimed at those students already working and usually take between two and five years to complete. 

International students often get confused between an LL.M program and a JD (Juris Doctor). A JD is mostly only studied in the United States as part of the process to become a qualified practising lawyer and can be considered equivalent to an LLB in the UK, despite being a postgraduate course. Both LL.M courses and JD courses in the US are offered at law schools, with both LL.M and JD students usually attending the same lectures and classes.

Requirements

LL.M. programs are usually only open to those students who have first obtained a degree in law, typically an LL.B. or J.D. There are exceptions to this, but an undergraduate degree or extensive experience in a related field is still required. Full-time LL.M. programs usually last one year and vary in their graduation requirements. Most programs require or allow students to write a thesis. Some programs are research oriented with little classroom time (similar to a M.Phil.), while others require students to take a set number of classes (similar to a taught degree or M.Sc.).

LL.M. degrees are often earned by students wishing to develop more concentrated expertise in a particular area of law. Pursuing an LL.M. degree may also allow law students to build a professional network. Some associations provide LL.M. degree holders with structures designed to strengthen their connections among peers and to access a competitive business environment, much like an MBA degree.

Australia
In Australia, the LL.M. is generally only open to law graduates. However, some universities permit non-law graduates to undertake variants of the degree. There are nearly 100 LLM courses in Australia across 25 institutions taught in English.

The shortage of graduate program/articles places has resulted in some LL.B. graduates proceeding directly to an LL.M. course before seeking graduate employment.

Unique variants of the LL.M. exist, such as the Master of Legal Practice (M.L.P.) available at the Australian National University, where students who have completed the Graduate Diploma of Legal Practice (which law graduates must obtain before being able to be admitted as a solicitor/barrister), will be granted some credit towards the Master qualification. Other variants of the LL.M. are more similar to the LL.M. available in the wider Commonwealth but under a different title, for example Master of Commercial Law, Master of International Law or Master of Human Rights Law. These courses are usually more specialised than a standard LL.M.

Canada

In Canada, the LL.M. is generally  open to law graduates holding an LL.B., LL.L., B.C.L., or a J.D. as a first degree.  Students can choose to take research based LL.M. degrees or course based LL.M. degrees.  Research based LL.M. degrees are one- or two-year programs that require students to write a thesis that makes a significant contribution to their field of research.  Course based LL.M. degrees do not require a significant research paper.  An LL.M. can be studied part-time, and at some schools, through distance learning.  LL.M. degrees can be general, or students can choose to pursue a specialized area of research.

Canadian law graduates pursue LL.M. degrees because they would like to pursue a career in academia or because they would like to deepen their knowledge in a specific area of the law. Canadian law graduates in most of the provinces in Canada must complete an internship with a law firm (known as "articling") and a professional legal training course, as well as pass professional exams in order to be called to the bar in a province.

Foreign trained lawyers who wish to practice in Canada will first need to have their education and experience assessed by the Federation of Law Societies of Canada's National Committee on Accreditation. Upon having received a certificate of accreditation from the National Committee on Accreditation, foreign law graduates would then have to obtain articles with a law firm, take the professional legal training course, and pass the professional exams to be called to the bar in a province.

The University of British Columbia's LLM in Common Law is an example of one of a few LLM courses that help to prepare students for the professional exams.

China (Mainland)

The LL.M. is available at China University of Political Science and Law, and the entrance requirements are: a native English speaker, or near native English, with any bachelor's degree. The course is flexible and allows students to study Mandarin and assists with organizing work experience in Beijing and other cities in China. It normally takes two years, but can be completed in one and a half years if students take the required credits in time.

The flagship of the China-EU School of Law (CESL) in Beijing is a Double Master Programme including a Master of Chinese Law and a Master of European and International Law. The Master of European and International Law is taught in English, open for international students and can be studied as a single master programme. CESL also offers an International Master of Chinese Law (IMCL) which is an LL.M. in Chinese law taught entirely in English.

Beijing Foreign Studies University has launched an online LLM for international professionals. The course is taken over two years, with the first covering online lessons through video and assignments, the second year is for the dissertation and an online defense is required at the end. Students are required to attend Beijing for an introductory week in September to enroll and meet students and staff. Students also have the opportunity to take work experience at a top five law firm in China.

LL.M degree programs are available at many other universities in Mainland China, such as at Peking University, Tsinghua University, Shanghai Jiaotong University, and Shanghai International Studies University.

France

In France, the LL.M. is in English.
The LL.M. in International Business Law is available at Panthéon-Assas University (Paris), the oldest school of law in France.

The entrance requirements are:

 Very good English level, with master's degree in law (or equivalent); or
 Alternative diploma and four years' professional experience.

The course is flexible and allows students to study French.

A further 11 institutions in France offer almost 20 other LLM programs taught in English, with specialisms including European Law.

Germany

In Germany, the LL.M. is seen as an advanced legal qualification of supplementary character. As such, Master of Laws programmes are generally open not only to law graduates, but also to graduates of related subjects or those displaying a genuine interest in and link to the particular LL.M. programme in question. Some graduates choose to undertake their LL.M. directly following their "Erstes Juristisches Staatsexamen" (the "first state examination" constitutes the first stage of the official German legal training and completes the German law degree as a "Jurist" which is an equivalent to Masters), an alternative postgraduate course, or their "Zweites Juristisches Staatsexamen" (that is, the second and final stage of the official German legal training, following which graduates are referred to as "Volljuristen" who then have access to practice in different branches of the legal profession). On the other hand, many professionals now take career breaks in order to study for an LL.M., in particular for subjects of growing importance or those with constantly changing dynamics, such as European law, economic law or media law for example.

Hong Kong 
LL.M. degree programmes are offered by the law faculties of The University of Hong Kong, the Open University of Hong Kong, The Chinese University of Hong Kong and the City University of Hong Kong. An LL.B. degree is usually required for admission, but for some specialised programmes, such as the LL.M. in Human Rights programme offered by HKU, require an undergraduate degree in laws or any related discipline.

India
In India, the thrust of legal education is on the undergraduate law degrees with most of those opting for the undergraduate law degree either going forward to enroll themselves with the Bar Council of India and start practicing as Advocates or giving legal advice without being eligible to appear in courts (a consequence of non-enrollment). Similar to the United Kingdom, a master's degree in law in India is basically opted to specialize in particular areas of law. Traditionally the most popular areas of specialization in these master's degrees in law in India have been constitutional law, family law and taxation law.

However, with the establishment of the specialized autonomous law schools in India in 1987 (the first was the National Law School of India University) much emphasis is being given at the master's level of legal education in India. With the establishment of these universities, focus in specialization has been shifted to newer areas such as corporate law, intellectual property law, international trade law etc. Master's degree of Law in India was in earlier times of 2 years but at present it is of only 1 year.

Ireland
A number of universities and colleges in Ireland offer LL.M. Master of Laws programmes, such as Dublin City University, Trinity College Dublin, University College Cork who have an LL.M. e-Law programme, National University of Ireland, Galway (NUIG) who offer an LL.M in Public Law, National University of Ireland, Maynooth (NUIM), who offer an LLM programme and an LLM in International Business Law (this is a dual degree with the Catholic University of Lyon), The Law Society of Ireland in partnership with Northumbria University offer two LLM programmes, and Griffith College in Dublin and Cork who offer LL.M. programmes in International, Commercial and Human Rights Law. Hibernia College offer a completely online LL.M. in International Business Law validated by Birmingham City University.

University College Dublin also offers the Masters in Common Law (MCL/ Magisterii in Jure Communi, M.Jur.Com), an advanced two-year programme for non-law graduates. The degree is a qualifying law degree for admittance to the entrance exams of the Honorable Society of King's Inns.

Italy
Italy offers both master programs in Italian and in English, depending on the school. They are often called "laurea specialistica", that is, the second step of the Bologna plan (European curriculum), and in this case they last two years. For example, the University of Milan offers a 2 years LLM on Sustainable Development.  In South Tyrol programmes are also taught in German, as in Bolzano.

In Italy the term "master" often refers to a vocational master, 6 or 12 months long, on specific areas, such as "law and internet security", or "law of administrative management", is often taught part-time to allow professionals already working in the field to improve their skills.

Mauritius

The LLM in International Business Law from Panthéon-Assas University is also available in Mauritius in Medine Village campus.

Norway
The Norwegian legal degrees master i rettsvitenskap (English for master in jurisprudence) are officially translated to English as Master of Laws (LL.M.), as these degrees are more comprehensive than the basic graduate law degree in common law countries (e.g., J.D. and LL.B). The last year in the five-year professional Norwegian law degree program is thus considered to correspond to a LL.M specialization. In addition, the universities with legal faculties at the masters level offers several LL.M programmes. For example, Universitetet i Oslo offers tuition-free LL.M courses in Public International Law, Maritime Law, Information and Communication Technology (ICT Law), as well as distinct specializations in human rights.

Pakistan
In Pakistan, University of the Punjab, University of Karachi, Shaheed Zulfiqar Ali Bhutto University of Law, International Islamic University, Islamabad, Government College University, Faisalabad, University of Sargodha are LL.M. degree awarding institutions.
Completing a LL.M. qualification in Pakistan consists of studying eight subjects in four semesters; this spans over a period of two years and also requires the student to write a thesis on a proposed topic. A student has to pass in each of the subject in order to qualify for LL.M. degree, and the passing mark is set at 60%. The programme is taught in English.

Universities in Pakistan teach comparative constitutional law, comparative human rights law and comparative jurisprudence as mandatory subjects. The programmes also include research methodology and four elective subjects, which may include company law, taxation law, intellectual property law and banking law.

Portugal
The Master of Laws programmes offered in Portugal are extremely varied but haven't, for the most part, adopted the designation LL.M., being more commonly called Mestrado em Direito (Master's Degree in Law), like the ones at Coimbra University's Faculty of Law and Lusíada University of Porto. Albeit the classical Mestrado em Direito takes two years to finish and involves a scientific dissertation, there are some shorter variants. A few Mestrados with an international theme have specifically adopted the LL.M designation: the LL.M in European and Transglobal Business Law at the School of Law of the University of Minho and the LL.M. Law in a European and Global Context and the Advanced LL.M. in International Business Law, both at the Católica Global School of Law, in Lisbon.

Singapore
In Singapore, the LL.M. is in English.
The LL.M. in International Business Law from Panthéon-Assas University is also available in Singapore in Insead campus.

South Africa

In South Africa, the LL.M. is a postgraduate degree offered both as a course-based, and as a research-based Master's.  In the former case, the degree comprises advanced coursework in a specific area of law as well as (limited) related research, usually in the form of a "short dissertation", while in the latter, the degree is entirely thesis ("dissertation") based. The first type, typically, comprises "practice-oriented" topics (e.g. in tax, mining law), while the second type is theory-oriented, often preparing students for admission to LL.D. or Ph.D. programmes; see . The research Master's essentially reflects an ability to conduct independent research, whereas a Doctoral thesis is, in addition, an original contribution in the field of study. Admission is generally limited to LL.B. graduates, although holders of other law degrees, such as the BProc, may be able to apply if admitted as attorneys and / or by completing supplementary LL.B. coursework.

Taiwan
In Taiwan, law can be studied as a postgraduate degree resulting in an LL.M. Some LL.M. programs in Taiwan are offered to students with or without a legal background. However, the graduation requirements for students with a legal background are lower than for those students who do not have a legal background (to account for fundamental legal subjects that were taken during undergraduate studies). Students studying in an LL.M. program normally take three years to earn the necessary credits and finish a master's thesis.

United Kingdom
In the United Kingdom, an LL.M. programme is open to those holding a recognised legal qualification, generally an undergraduate degree in Laws or a CPE. They do not have to be or intend to be legal practitioners. An LL.M. is not required, nor is it a sufficient qualification in itself to practise as a solicitor or barrister, since this requires completion of the Legal Practice Course, Bar Professional Training Course, or, if in Scotland, the Diploma in Legal Practice, but is an opportunity to gain specialist knowledge of a particular area of law or an understanding of the legal systems of other nations. As with other degrees, an LL.M. can be studied on a part-time basis at many institutions and in some circumstances by distance learning. Some providers of the Bar Professional Training Course and the Legal Practice Course also allow the student to gain an LL.M. qualification on top of these professional courses by writing a dissertation. 

The UK offers over 1000 different LL.Ms across its HE sector. Large law faculties such as Queen Mary University of London offer 25 different programs, whilst other such as Aston University simply offer one program which sits within their business school portfolio. Institutions allow those without a first degree in law onto their LL.M. programme although there are still minimum educational requirements, such as an undergraduate degree, or evidence of substantial professional experience in a related field. Examples of such programmes include the Master of Studies in Legal Research at Oxford, the LL.M. degrees at the University of Edinburgh and LL.M.s at the University of Leicester In addition, Queen's University Belfast offers an LL.M. suite, accessible to legal and social science graduates, leading to specialisms in sustainable development, corporate governance, devolution or human rights. Northumbria University offers an innovative approach to an LL.M. qualification to students starting the master's programme as undergraduates. Students completing this four-year programme graduate with a combined LL.M. and Legal Practice Course professional qualification or BPTC.

An LL.M course can therefore sometimes be a choice comparable to an MBA or an accountancy degree, acting as a supplementary discipline intended for career enhancement. So, for example, an engineer working extensively with matters such as intellectual property (patents, etc.) may seek broader knowledge and recognition by pursuing an LL.M.

The University of Law (UK) offers two online LL.M. programmes in Legal Practice (Conflict Resolution) and Legal Practice (Intellectual Property).

Oxbridge

The Universities of Oxford and Cambridge have taken slightly different approaches to other British universities to postgraduate legal study, as they have in other areas.

The University of Cambridge has a taught postgraduate law course, which formerly conferred an LL.B. on successful candidates (undergraduates studying law at Cambridge received a B.A.).  In 1982 the LL.B. for postgraduate students was replaced with a more conventional LL.M. to avoid confusion with undergraduate degrees in other universities.  Additionally in 2012 the University of Cambridge introduced the M.C.L. (Masters of Corporate Law) aimed at postgraduate students with interests in corporate law.

The University of Oxford unconventionally names its taught masters of laws B.C.L. (Bachelor of Civil Law) and M.Jur. (Magister Juris), and its research masters either MPhil (Master of Philosophy) or MSt (Master of Studies).  Oxford continues to name its principal postgraduate law degree the B.C.L. for largely historic reasons, as the B.C.L. is one of the oldest (and therefore within the Oxford hierarchy, most senior) degrees, having been conferred since the sixteenth century.  The M.Jur. was introduced in 1991.  At present there is no LL.M. degree conferred by the university.  Oxford claims that the B.C.L. is "the most highly regarded taught masters-level qualification in the common law world". Additionally, the University of Oxford introduced the MSc in Law and Finance (MLF) and the MSc in Taxation in 2010 and 2016, respectively. These degrees are taught jointly by the Faculty of Law and the Saïd Business School.

United States

In the United States, the acquisition of an LL.M. degree is often a way to specialize in an area of law such as tax law, business law, international business law, health law, trial advocacy, environmental law or intellectual property. A number of schools have combined J.D.-LL.M. programs, while others offer the degree through online study. Some LL.M. programs feature a general study of American law. Degree requirements vary by school, and they often differ for LL.M. students who previously earned a J.D. from an American law school and LL.M. students who previously earned a law degree from a non-American law school.

Programs for foreign legal graduates
An LL.M. degree from an ABA-approved law school also allows a foreign lawyer to become eligible to apply for admission to the bar (license to practice) in certain states. Each state has different rules relating to the admittance of foreign-educated lawyers to state bar associations.

An LL.M. degree from an ABA-approved law school qualifies a foreign legal graduate to take the bar exam in Alabama, California, New Hampshire, New York, Texas, as well as in the independent republic of Palau.

In addition, legal practice in the home jurisdiction plus a certain amount of coursework at an accredited law school qualifies a foreign legal graduate to take the bar exam in Alaska, the District of Columbia, Massachusetts, Missouri, Pennsylvania, Rhode Island, Tennessee, Utah and West Virginia. However, a number of states, including Arizona, Florida, Georgia, New Jersey and North Carolina only recognize J.D. degrees from accredited law schools as qualification to take the bar.

New York allows foreign lawyers from civil law countries to sit for the New York bar exam once they have completed a minimum of 24 credit hours (usually but not necessarily in an LL.M. program) at an ABA-approved law school involving at least two basic subjects tested on the New York bar exam.  However, beginning for those who take the bar exam in July 2013, applicants will be required to complete 24 credits of law school coursework, including 12 credits in specific areas of law.    Lawyers from common-law countries face more lenient restrictions and may not need to study at an ABA-approved law school.  Foreign lawyers from both civil law and common law jurisdictions, however, are required to demonstrate that they have successfully completed a course of law studies of at least three years that would fulfill the educational requirements to bar admission in their home country.

International law and other LL.M. programs
As of 2008, there is one LL.M. degree in International Law offered by The Fletcher School of Law and Diplomacy at Tufts University, the oldest school of international affairs in the United States. Given that the degree specializes in international law, and is not teaching a first degree in U.S. law (the J.D. degree), the program has not sought ABA accreditation.

The Notre Dame Law School at the University of Notre Dame offers an LL.M in International Human Rights Law to JD graduates from ABA-accredited US schools or LL.B or equivalent from accredited non-US schools.

Both Duke University School of Law and Cornell Law School offer J.D. students the opportunity to simultaneously pursue an LL.M. in International and Comparative Law.

The University of Nebraska-Lincoln College of Law provides an LL.M. in Space, Cyber & Telecommunications Law, the only program providing focused study in these three areas.  The program was established using a grant from NASA and a partnership with the U.S. Air Force Strategic Command.

St. Mary's University offers the LL.M. in International and Comparative Law, with students having the option to complete both it and their J.D. simultaneously.

The University of Tulsa College of Law offers an LL.M. in American Indian and Indigenous Peoples Law to JD graduates from ABA-accredited US schools or LL.B or equivalent from accredited non-US schools.

The University of Washington School of Law offers an LL.M. in Sustainable International Development, the first program of its kind to focus on international development law. LL.M. students in this program are also able to elect for a concentration in Indigenous Rights Law. Similarly, the school offers a separate LL.M. degree in Asian and Comparative Law.

There is one institution that offers an ABA-approved LL.M, that does not offer the first degree in law (the J.D. degree): The U.S. Army Judge Advocate General's Legal Center and School offers an officer's resident graduate course, a specialized program beyond the first degree in law, leading to an LL.M. in Military Law, with concentrations in Administrative and Civil Law, Government Contract and Fiscal Law, Criminal Law, and Operational and International Law.

See also
 Magister Juris
 Master of Studies in Law
 List of Master of Laws programs
 Doctor of Laws

References

External links

Laws, Master
Law degrees